Ostankino Palace is a former summer residence and private opera theatre of Sheremetev family, originally situated several kilometres to the north from Moscow but now a part of the North-Eastern Administrative Okrug of Moscow. Extant historical Ostankino includes the main wooden palace, built in 1792–1798 around a theater hall, with adjacent Egyptian and Italian pavilions, a 17th-century Trinity church, and fragments of the old Ostankino park with a replica of Milovzor folly.

History

16th century to 1787 

The first documentary evidence of Ostankino—then known as Ostashkovo—dates to the middle of the 16th century, when Tsar Ivan IV of Russia granted these lands to the hold of Alexey Satin, relative of statesman Alexey Adashev. Satin, however, was executed by Ivan in 1560, and the lands passed to one Horn, a German mercenary, and, in 1585, to notable diak (statesman) Vasily Schelkalov. Under Schelkalov, the unpopulated lands of Ostashkovo developed into a relatively prosperous manor estate with ponds and cedar park. This manor was destroyed by plunder and fire in the Time of Troubles.

The end of hostilities and ascension of the House of Romanov brought the new owners: the princes Tcherkassky. They replanted the parks and established a spacious hunting reserve, expanding east to Alekseyevskoye village. A 1677 marriage between the Tcherkassky and Odoyevsky families brought in a valuable asset: architect Pavel Potekhin, a slave of Odoyevsky family, who designed and built the still-extant Trinity church (1678–1683, 1691–1692).

In the first half of the 18th century Ostankino was gradually converted from a permanent country manor to a temporary retreat with hunt, house theater and other entertainment of the period; empress Elizabeth of Russia herself paid a visit to Ostankino in 1742. The following year, through a marriage between princess Varvara, the sole heir of Tcherkassky fortunes, and Peter Sheremetev, son of field marshal Sheremetev, Ostankino passed to the Sheremetevs and remained their property until 1917.

Throughout the 18th century the Sheremetevs lived primarily in Kuskovo, and Ostankino retained its temporary entertainment atmosphere.

Construction of the palace 

In 1787 Nikolai Sheremetev inherited Ostankino upon the death of his father. Well-educated and extremely wealthy, Nikolai Sheremetev was a patron of theater; his extravagant shows earned him nickname Croesus Junior. In the three following years Sheremetev established house theaters in Kuskovo, Kitai-gorod and Markovo. In 1790 he held an architectural contest for a Palace of Arts in Moscow, but eventually preferred to build it in the country, far from city life. Building a new large theater in Kuskovo would have ruined an already completed ensemble, so in the same 1790 Sheremetev finally chose Ostankino.

Sheremetev initially hired someone Casier, a self-proclaimed architect employed by Golitsyn family. This project did not materialize; by 1792, Sheremetev built only a two-story wooden theater hall, apparently discarding Casier's plans. Then, as Sheremetev recruited services of influential contemporary architects (most notably Francesco Camporesi, see Attribution dispute section), work accelerated and the wooden palace was structurally in its present shape, including pavilion wings, by the end of 1793. Contemporary witnesses reported that Sheremetev was so confident in perfection of his palace that he set up an unprecedented veil of secrecy around construction site: the manor was closed to any visitors, covered with shrouds, architects worked in parallel unaware of each other's progress.

Interior works took another six years. In 1793 Sheremetev ordered redesign of theater so that the main hall and stage could be transformed at will to a single ballroom. In 1794 he redecorated already finished Italian pavilion and expanded the galleries between pavilions and the palace. Each round of decoration required stripping of earlier finishes. In the same 1794 Sheremetev realized that the palace fails to accommodate all the guests and ordered another round of expansion and remodelling. Giacomo Quarenghi and Pyotr Argunov presented their ambitious expansion drafts, however, actual expansion carried out by (most likely) Ivan Starov was quite modest and did not change palace exterior - at least, its southern facade. Subsequent expansion concentrated on the sprawling side wings, most notably the Italian rotunda (1796) that would become a study of Alexander II sixty years later.

Major work on the palace was completed by the end of 1798, while lesser decoration and landscaping projects continued until the end of Sheremetev's life. The palace remains the largest extant wooden structure in Moscow (brick was used locally for fireproofing the ovens).

Park 

In 1761 Sheremetevs hired a garden manager, Johann Manstadt, who supervised expansion of the park and its conversion to a commercial enterprise. Under Manstadt, Ostankino garden became an important supply of exotic plants for wealthy Moscow families; customers included Catherine II and Grigory Potyomkin. The park sprawled over territories of present-day All-Russia Exhibition Centre, Botanical Garden, Ostankino Television buildings and residential blocks around it. 

Nikolai Sheremetev initially assigned landscaping to his serf architect, Mironov, but soon deemed Mironov's plan inappropriate. The job passed to Pyotr Argunov, with consultancy by Francis Reid, manager of Tsaritsyno Park project. Reid and his associate, Nikolai Kuverin, worked in Ostankino in 1791–1794. A permanent garden manager, Robert Manners, was hired in 1796 and stayed in Ostankino for thirty years. Reid's input apparently concentrated on the immediate vicinity of the palace; regular English garden north from the palace was planted in 1797 by Manners.

Two seasons of the theater 

The theater opened in summer of 1795, amazing the guests with unprecedented stage effects. Paul I, who ascended to the throne in November 1796, summoned Nikolai Sheremetev to Saint Petersburg. As one of the highest statesmen of the reign, Sheremetev now lived mostly in Saint Petersburg. The splendid theater operated publicly for just one season in spring 1797, with one show for emperor Paul and one for Stanisław Poniatowski, former king of partitioned Poland. In 1800 Sheremetev reduced the artistic company—barely sufficient for the private entertainment.

The 1802 death of Sheremetev's wife, former actress Praskovya Kovaleva-Zhemchugova, spelled the end of the theater. Nikolai Sheremetev disbanded his theater company and abstained from public entertainment till the end of his life (1809). There were accounts of an 1801 show for Alexander I; however, modern scholars deem these reports incorrect: the show was planned but did not materialize.

19th to 21st centuries 

Sheremetev's heirs barely maintained the palace; in the 1830s they demolished the old living quarters dating back to the 17th century, and demolished some of the free-standing service buildings. The palace was revived for a short time in 1856, when Alexander II chose Ostankino as his temporary residence during his coronation. Ground floor rooms were converted to living quarters and redecorated, probably by Mikhail Bykovsky.

Ostankino Park fell in neglect in the 1830s. In the second part of the 19th century parts of the park were sold to dacha developers and leased to farmers, while the greenhouses concentrated on commercial flower growing.

At the end of the 19th century Sheremetev Park became a popular picnic destination; Sheremetevs built a temporary summer stage and ballroom. The palace, which went through another round of repairs and alterations in the 1870s, was opened for public viewing.

In the Soviet period the nationalized palace operated as a museum of serf art. In 1935 the eastern part of former Ostankino park grounds were allotted to the emerging Agricultural Exhibition and completely remodelled by 1939. In the same 1939 a part of regular English garden, immediately north from the palace, was replanted; Ostankino park proper shrunk to just one square kilometer as the lands further north became the State Botanical Garden.

Throughout the Soviet period the main theater hall was set up a single ballroom space. Partitions separating stage, orchestra pit and spectator areas were re-introduced during the controversial repairs of the 2000s, so the theater can once again be used in its original function.

Attribution dispute 

Nikolai Sheremetev managed construction himself, hiring architects at will; in addition to original architectural work, he reused drafts of Saint Petersburg architects. Contemporary academic studies agree on the fact that, while certain parts and details of the palace can be attributed to specific architects (with different degree of probability), the palace as a whole—even its basic layout—has no single author apart from Sheremetev himself.

Of all architects involved in the project, Ivan Starov's input is least controversial; Starov's trademark palladian windows without impost columns were unique for the period, his work for Sheremetev in Saint Petersburg and Moscow was thoroughly documented and studied. Modern studies also attribute specific palace interiors to Vincenzo Brenna. Shape of southern façade is usually credited to Francesco Camporesi.

Pyotr Argunov's role as a long-time construction manager is undisputed, but his actual creative input remains unresolved. Karl Blank, who died in 1793, consulted Sheremetev in the beginning of the project; later stages of construction (1794–1798) were influenced by Giacomo Quarenghi. Elizvoy Nazarov consulted Sheremetev throughout the project.

Igor Grabar attributed design of the palace to Vasily Bazhenov; this viewpoint is discarded by modern studies as unsubstantiated.

See also
Kuskovo
Arkhangelskoye Estate
Tōdai-ji, largest wooden building in the world
New Zealand Parliament Buildings, Old Government Buildings (Wellington) - second-largest wooden building in the world

References

External links
Official site of the Ostankino Museum
Ostankino Estate Museum (Moscow)

Theatres completed in 1798
Museums in Moscow
Theatres in Moscow
Neoclassical architecture in Russia
Neoclassical palaces
Palaces in Moscow
Historic house museums in Russia
Gardens in Russia
Churches in Moscow
1798 establishments in the Russian Empire
Cultural heritage monuments of federal significance in Moscow